Leonard Thompson Troland (1889–1932) was an American physicist, psychologist and psychical researcher.

Career

Troland graduated in 1912 from the Massachusetts Institute of Technology with a degree in biochemistry. He then studied psychology at Harvard University, where he obtained a Ph.D. in 1915. He worked for a year as  a Harvard Travelling fellow at the General Electric Nela research lab. He served as a member of committees of the National Research Council on vision and aviation psychology. At Harvard, he gave advanced courses in psychology, and he followed up his 1926 book The Mystery of Mind with Fundamentals in Human Motivation in 1928. At the same time he was chief engineer of the Technicolor Motion Picture Corporation of California and was appointed Director of research at Technicolor in 1925.

He was elected to serve as president of the Optical Society of America from 1922 to 1923.

He gave his name to the troland (symbol Td), the unit of conventional retinal illuminance. It is meant as a method for correcting photometric measurements of luminance values impinging on the human eye by scaling them by the effective pupil size.

The National Academy of Sciences gives an award on his behalf.

In 1932, he fell to his death from Mount Wilson.

Psychical research

Troland took interest in psychical research and had carried out experiments in telepathy at Harvard University which were reported in 1917. He was one of the first scientists to use a machine in this type of experiment instead of a human experimenter. The machine consisted of a lamp which when triggered would light either of two square blocks. The agent would attempt to perceive the light in one room while the receiver would use a switch to identify which lamp had been lit in the other room. Troland discovered that the subjects had produced below chance expectations.

Publications

A Technique for the Experimental Study of Telepathy and Other Alleged Clairvoyant Processes (1917)
The Nature of Matter and Electricity: An Outline of Modern Views [with Daniel Frost Comstock] (1917)
The Mystery of Mind (1926)
The Fundamentals of Human Motivation (1928)

See also
Optical Society of America
Troland Research Awards

References

External links
 Articles Published by early OSA Presidents – Journal of the Optical Society of America
Trolands Research Awards
Leonard Troland and the Story of the Photon's Name

1889 births
1932 deaths
20th-century American physicists
20th-century American psychologists
Harvard University alumni
Parapsychologists
Presidents of Optica (society)
Fellows of the American Physical Society
Optical physicists